Age of Gerombolan (Indonesian: Zaman Gerombolan) or literally translates to Age of Hordes, were a term used for period of political instability and regional armed conflicts mainly between communists, Islamist, and secular nationalist in newly independent Indonesia particularly during early Liberal democracy period under Sukarno. It is also a term frequently used to refer the direct rule of Darul Islam in rural area of West Java, South Sulawesi, and South Kalimantan where Darul Islam militia had strong base until early 1960s. Although the specific year is not agreed, it is generally referred to conflicts after 1949 and well-used until 1962, although sporadic rebellions mostly under Darul Islam did not end until early 1970s. The term "gerombolan" or hordes sometimes also used to refer other rebel groups during the time such as Permesta, Mandau Talawang Pancasila, rebellion under Andi Aziz, and Republic of South Maluku.

References 

Liberal democracy period in Indonesia
History of Indonesia